Greg Vanderjagt (born 27 May 1984) is an Australian professional basketball coach and former player. He played 10 seasons in the National Basketball League (NBL) before entering the coaching ranks. He served as the head coach of the Brisbane Bullets in 2022–23.

Playing career
Vanderjagt, a 7'0" (213 cm) tall centre, started his NBL career with the Townsville Crocodiles in 2003–04, averaging just 4.5 points and 2.6 rebounds in his first 31 games. He stayed with the Crocodiles until the end of the 2007–08 NBL season, leaving the club after appearing in 153 games.

After leaving the Crocodiles, Vanderjagt moved to the Gold Coast and joined the Blaze for the 2008–09 season. He managed just nine games in his first season with the Blaze due to sustaining an injury in November 2008. He returned from injury in 2009 and played out the 2009–10 season with the Blaze, appearing in 25 games and helping the team to the semi-finals where they were knocked out by eventual champions Perth in two straight games.

After receiving no new contract offers, Vanderjangt sat out the entire 2010–11 season. When Townsville lost their starting centre in Luke Schenscher for the first seven games of the 2011–12 season, the Crocodiles wasted no time in signing Vanderjagt as an injury replacement. In his seven games with the Crocodiles, Vanderjagt averaged 5.0 points and 1.7 rebounds per game, making such an impression on head coach Paul Woolpert that he began replacing Ben Allen as starting centre. He left the club in late November 2011 upon Schenscher's return to the line-up.

On 16 July 2013, Vanderjagt re-signed with the Crocodiles for the 2013–14 season. On 28 July 2014, he re-signed with the Crocodiles for the 2014–15 season.

Coaching career
In 2014, Vanderjagt took on an assistant coaching role with the QBL's Mackay Meteors.

On 3 July 2015, Vanderjagt announced his retirement from professional basketball to take on an assistant coaching role at the Townsville Crocodiles.

In 2020, Vanderjagt was appointed assistant coach of the Brisbane Bullets. On 13 December 2022, he was elevated to the Bullets' interim head coach. Ten days later, he was confirmed as the Bullets' head coach for the rest of the 2022–23 NBL season. In February 2023, he was re-assigned to lead assistant coach for the 2023–24 season.

References

External links
Eurobasket.com profile
NBL stats

1984 births
Living people
Australian men's basketball players
Centers (basketball)
Gold Coast Blaze players
People from New South Wales
Townsville Crocodiles players